Oliver Nestor, better known as DL Incognito, is a Canadian hip hop rapper and producer from Ottawa, Ontario. He is currently signed to URBNET Records but also operates his independent label Nine Planets Hip Hop along with his brother. In 2007 and 2009, he was nominated for a Juno for Best Rap Recording.

Musical career 
DL first started his career in 1999 when he appeared on the Nine Planets Hip Hop compilation Welcome To The Land Of The Lost.

His first solo release was his 2002 release, A Sample and a Drum Machine. Two years later, he released the album Life's a Collection of Experiences.

In 2006, he released Organic Music for a Digital World. Rowald Pruyn of RapReviews gave the album a very favorable 8.5/10, saying "DL Incognito, whose name he interprets as 'delivering lyrics on the down low,' has skills on the mic which are surpassed only by his ability for self-reflection." The album received a Juno nomination.

Following this, he released A Captured Moment in Time in 2008, which like his last albums, also received a Juno nomination.

In 2013, he released the album Someday Is Less Than a Second Away, which features D-Sisive, along with others. Exclaim! gave the album a very favorable review and Chayne Japal said: "His recent efforts have resulted in a fifth album, Someday is Less than a Second Away, a tight, potent record that utilizes his and his collaborators' strengths."

DL Incognito said in an interview that his main goal is "just trying to give Canadian hip-hop an identity." In another interview, he said what inspires him to rap is life: "Life inspires me, all the ups & downs that people go through, current events, happiness, pain, everything is an inspiration. As I continue on this journey I've realized that life's a collection of experiences and my albums are captured moments in time."

Name 
The name 'DL Incognito' means "Deliverying Lyrics on the Low".

Personal life 
Nestor is of Haitian and French-Canadian descent.

Discography

Solo albums 

A Sample and a Drum Machine
 Released: July 23, 2002
 Label: Nine Planets Hip Hop
Life's a Collection of Experiences
 Released: November 23, 2004
 Label: Nine Planets Hip Hop
Organic Music for a Digital World 
 Released: June 20, 2006
 Label: Universal Music Canada/URBNET Records
A Captured Moment in Time 
 Released: April 8, 2008
 Label: Nine Planets Hip Hop/URBNET Records
Someday Is Less Than a Second Away
 Released: April 16, 2013
 Label: URBNET Records
What Once Was Will Never Be
 Released: December 2, 2022
 Label: Orng Peel Laab

Singles

"Rugged Raw"
"Spit Forever 2"
"Proof"
"Verbalerity"
"Live In My Element"
"Make a Difference"
"Air Play"

References

External links
 Official website
 DL Incognito at Bandcamp
 DL Incognito at Discogs
 DL Incognito at Soundcloud
 DL Incognito at MySpace

Canadian male rappers
21st-century Canadian rappers
Canadian hip hop record producers
Black Canadian musicians
Canadian people of Haitian descent
Musicians from Ottawa
Living people
Canadian twins
Year of birth missing (living people)
21st-century Canadian male musicians